The Tschanz drive or Oerlikon single-axle drive is a fully sprung single-axle drive for electric locomotives  named after its inventor Otto Tschanz or after Maschinenfabrik Oerlikon. The drive was not widely used because its competitor, the Buchli drive, was cheaper and lighter.

Construction
The Tschanz drive is a fully sprung drive, which means that the motors are housed in the sprung part of the locomotive and are thus less exposed to shocks from the rails. Also, the shocks from the wheelsets to the rail are reduced because there is less unsprung weight on them.

The traction motor is firmly mounted in the locomotive frame and drives through a single-stage gearbox to a gear that is located to one side of the wheel. The power transmission from this gear to the axle is done with a cardan shaft which has universal joints at both ends and passes through a hollow axle.

Use
Rolling stock on which the Tschanz drive was used include:
 SBB-CFF-FFS Be 2/5
 SBB-CFF-FFS Ae 4/8
 BTB BCe 2/5 
 PLM 242 BE 1 
 PLM 262 AE

Patents
Drive device on railway vehicles with motors firmly mounted on the spring-loaded frame, (1916).
Motor mechanism for railway vehicles, with electric motors rigidly fixed to the frame mounted on suspension springs, (1917).
Driving mechanism for railway-vehicles with electric motors rigidly mounted on spring-supported frames, (1919).

See also
 Quill drive
 Winterthur Universal Drive

References

Further reading

    K. Sachs: Elektrische Vollbahnlokomotiven. Julius Springer, Berlin 1928, S. 308–309 (Fussnote).
    Elektrifizierung der Gotthardbahn. In: Schweizerische Bauzeitung. Band 69/70, Nr. 7, 1917, S. 83, doi:10.5169/seals-33931.

Electric locomotives
Electric locomotives of Switzerland
Locomotive parts